Charles Landis Shoemaker (August 10, 1939 – May 31, 1990) was an American professional baseball player. A native of Los Angeles, he appeared as a second baseman in parts of three Major League Baseball seasons (1961–1962; 1964) for the Kansas City Athletics.

Shoemaker attended high school in Montebello, California, where he was a top athlete, and then the University of Arizona. He led Arizona to second place at the College World Series in 1959 and third in 1960. He was a three time All-American. In 1961, he attained the rare distinction of earning All-American honors at two different positions (shortstop and second base). Over his college career, he led the Wildcats in at bats, hits, triples and stolen bases. He was named to the 1950s All-Decade Team and inducted to the University of Arizona Hall of Fame in 1991. At the time of his induction, he still held the team record for triples in a season (12) and in a career (31) and was fifth in strike-out/at-bat ratio for a season, having struck out only six times in 1961. Upon graduation, his coach, Frank Sancet, called him the best college infielder he had ever seen.

After batting .271 in 82 games played for the Class A Portsmouth-Norfolk Tides of the Sally League, he was recalled by the A's that September. He started in six games at second and pinch hit in a seventh, and had four multi-hit games. In his Major League debut, Shoemaker collected ten hits in 28 at bats, including two doubles, for a .385 average.

Charlie Shoemaker died in Mount Penn, Pennsylvania, of a self-inflicted gunshot wound at the age of 50 on May 31, 1990.

References

External links
Career statistics from Baseball Reference

1939 births
1990 deaths
Albuquerque Dukes players
Arizona Wildcats baseball players
Baseball players from Los Angeles
Binghamton Triplets players
Charlotte Hornets (baseball) players
Dallas Rangers players
Kansas City Athletics players
Macon Peaches players
Major League Baseball second basemen
Nashville Vols players
Portland Beavers players
Portsmouth-Norfolk Tides players
Reading Phillies players
Savannah Senators players
Sportspeople from Montebello, California
Suicides by firearm in Pennsylvania
Vancouver Mounties players
Waterbury Pirates players
York Pirates players
1990 suicides
American expatriate baseball players in Canada